Ramapo (occasionally spelled Ramapough) is the name of several places and institutions in northern New Jersey and southeastern New York State. They were named after the Ramapough, a band of the Lenape Indians who migrated into the area from Connecticut by the seventeenth and early eighteenth centuries.

Places

New Jersey
Ramapo Valley County Reservation, a Bergen County park
Ramapo Mountain State Forest, in Bergen and Passaic Counties
Ramapo Lake

New York
Ramapo, New York, a town in Rockland County
Ramapo Central School District, serves the village of Suffern, and surrounding areas in the town of Ramapo
Ramapo High School (New York), in Ramapo
East Ramapo Central School District, serves the village of Spring Valley and surrounding areas in the town of Ramapo

New Jersey and New York
Ramapo Mountains
Ramapo River

Educational institutions
Ramapo College, in Mahwah, New Jersey, United States
Ramapo High School (New Jersey), in Franklin Lakes, New Jersey, United States
Ramapo Indian Hills Regional High School District, in Bergen County, New Jersey, United States

Other uses
 Golden v. Planning Board of Ramapo, a 1971 land use planning case
Hotel Ramapo, now called Taft Hotel, a historic residential hotel in Portland, Oregon
Ramapo Fault, in New York, New Jersey, and Pennsylvania
Ramapough Mountain Indians, or Ramapough Lenape Nation, a New Jersey state-recognized tribe
, a United States Navy oiler in commission from 1919 to 1946

See also